Mazosia is a genus of lichen-forming fungi in the family Roccellaceae. The genus was circumscribed by Italian lichenologist Abramo Bartolommeo Massalongo in 1854.

Species
Mazosia aptrootii 
Mazosia bambusae 
Mazosia bruguierae 
Mazosia carnea 
Mazosia endonigra 
Mazosia japonica 
Mazosia leptosticta 
Mazosia lueckingii  – India
Mazosia melanophthalma 
Mazosia paupercula 
Mazosia phyllosema 
Mazosia quadriseptata 
Mazosia rotula 
Mazosia tomentifera 
Mazosia uniseptata 
Mazosia viridescens

References

Roccellaceae
Arthoniomycetes genera
Lichen genera
Taxa named by Abramo Bartolommeo Massalongo
Taxa described in 1854